1306 Scythia, provisional designation , is a dark Ursula asteroid from the outer regions of the asteroid belt, approximately 72 kilometers in diameter. It was discovered on 22 July 1930, by Soviet astronomer Grigory Neujmin at the Simeiz Observatory on the Crimean peninsula. The asteroid was named for the historic region of Scythia.

Orbit and classification 

Scythia is a member of the Ursula family, a mid-sized asteroid family in the outer main-belt. It orbits the Sun at a distance of 2.9–3.4 AU once every 5 years and 7 months (2,041 days; semi-major axis of 3.15 AU). Its orbit has an eccentricity of 0.09 and an inclination of 15° with respect to the ecliptic. The body's observation arc begins with its official discovery observation at Simeiz in July 1930.

Physical characteristics 

In the Tholen classification, Scythia is a stony S-type asteroid, unlike the overall spectral type of the Ursula family which is that of a C- and X-type.

Rotation period 

In September 2003, a rotational lightcurve of Scythia was obtained from photometric observations by Robert Stephens at the Santana Observatory in California. Lightcurve analysis gave a rotation period of 15.05 hours with a brightness variation of 0.15 magnitude. In August 2008, Pierre Antonini measured a better period solution of 7.525 hours (or half the period) and an amplitude of 0.25 magnitude.

Diameter and albedo 

According to the surveys carried out by the Infrared Astronomical Satellite IRAS, the Japanese Akari satellite and the NEOWISE mission of NASA's Wide-field Infrared Survey Explorer, Scythia measures between 66.780 and 83.65 kilometers in diameter and its surface has a low albedo between 0.034 and 0.052.

The Collaborative Asteroid Lightcurve Link adopts the results obtained by IRAS, that is, an albedo of 0.0512 and a diameter of 67.14 kilometers based on an absolute magnitude of 9.71.

Naming 

This minor planet was named after the ancient region of Scythia, located east of the Black Sea. The official naming citation was mentioned in The Names of the Minor Planets by Paul Herget in 1955.

References

External links 
 Asteroid Lightcurve Database (LCDB), query form (info )
 Dictionary of Minor Planet Names, Google books
 Asteroids and comets rotation curves, CdR – Observatoire de Genève, Raoul Behrend
 Discovery Circumstances: Numbered Minor Planets (1)-(5000) – Minor Planet Center
 
 

001306
Discoveries by Grigory Neujmin
Named minor planets
001306
19300722